English singer and songwriter FKA Twigs has released two studio albums, one mixtape, three extended plays, twelve singles (including two as a featured artist), one promotional single and eighteen music videos.

Albums

Studio albums

Mixtapes

Extended plays

Singles

As lead artist

As featured artist

Promotional singles

Guest appearances

Other charted songs

Music videos

As artist

As director

Notes

References

External links
 
 
 
 

Discographies of British artists
Electronic music discographies
Rhythm and blues discographies